The 2021–22 Gonzaga Bulldogs men's basketball team represented Gonzaga University, located in Spokane, Washington, in the 2021–22 NCAA Division I men's basketball season. The team, also unofficially nicknamed the "Zags", is led by head coach Mark Few, in his 23rd season as head coach. This is the Bulldogs' 18th season at the on-campus McCarthey Athletic Center and 42nd season as a member of the West Coast Conference (WCC). They finished the season 28-4, 13-1 in WCC Play to finish as WCC regular season champions. They defeated San Francisco and Saint Mary’s to be champions of the WCC tournament. They received the WCC’s automatic bid to the NCAA tournament where they defeated Georgia State and Memphis to advance to the Sweet Sixteen where they lost to Arkansas.

Previous season
In a season limited due to the ongoing COVID-19 pandemic, the Bulldogs finished the 2020–21 season 31–1 and 15–0 in WCC play to win the regular season championship. They defeated Saint Mary's and BYU in the WCC tournament to win the tournament championship and receive the conference's automatic bid to the NCAA tournament. It was their 22nd straight trip to the NCAA Tournament. The Zags became the first Division I men's team since Kentucky in 2015 to enter the NCAA Tournament without a loss. They received the No. 1 seed in the West region where they beat Norfolk State, Oklahoma , Creighton, and USC to advance to the Final Four. There they defeated UCLA to become the first undefeated team to advance to the national championship game since Indiana State in 1979. The Bulldogs lost their first game of the season to Baylor in the championship game, denying the Bulldogs a perfect season.

Offseason

Coaching changes

Departures

Additions to staff

Player departures
Due to COVID-19, the NCAA ruled in October 2020 that the 2020–21 season would not count against the eligibility of any basketball player, thus giving all players the option to return in 2021–22. This in turn meant that seniors in the 2020–21 season had to declare themselves eligible for the 2021 NBA draft.

Incoming transfers

Recruiting classes

2021 recruiting class

2022 recruiting class

Preseason

Mark Few arrest and suspension 
On September 6, 2021, head coach Mark Few was pulled over by police and arrested for driving under the influence in Coeur d'Alene, Idaho. Few refused sobriety tests on the scene, but was shown to have a blood alcohol level of .119 and .120 from breath tests, well over the legal limit of .08. Few later apologized for the incident and pled guilty to misdemeanor DUI. The school suspended Few for three games for his actions. However, the suspension notably included two exhibition games and the first game of the regular season, meaning he was able to coach the November 13 game against No. 5 Texas.

Preseason rankings 
Gonzaga was a near-unanimous selection as the No. 1 team in the country in the preseason AP and Coaches poll.

Roster
 Roster is subject to change as/if players transfer or leave the program for other reasons.
 Matthew Lang was awarded a basketball scholarship for the second semester of the 2021–22 season.

Coaching staff

Schedule and results

|- 
!colspan=12 style=| Exhibition 

|-
!colspan=12 style=| Non-conference regular season

|-

|-
!colspan=12 style=|  WCC Regular Season

|-
!colspan=12 style=| WCC Tournament

|-
!colspan=12 style=| NCAA tournament

Source

Rankings

*AP does not release post-NCAA Tournament rankings.^Coaches did not release a Week 1 poll.

References

Gonzaga Bulldogs men's basketball seasons
Gonzaga
Gonzaga Bulldogs men's basketball
Gonzaga Bulldogs men's basketball
Gonzaga